Cancellaria  may refer to:
 Cancellaria, a genus of sea snails in the family Cancellariidae
 Cancellaria, a synonym of the plant genus Pavonia in the family Malvaceae